Season of Poison is the second studio album by American indie rock band Shiny Toy Guns. It was released on November 4, 2008 through Universal Motown Records Group. It peaked at #47 on the Billboard Hot 100 the following week. The album introduced the band's 3rd female vocalist, Sisely Treasure. The album featured two singles: "Ricochet!" and "Ghost Town".

Season of Poison generated far less hype than We Are Pilots and failed to sell well, resulting in a low sales count of 60,000 copies. In 2009, Jeremy Dawson admitted via Shiny Toy Guns' official website that while he believes Season of Poison is a great album, it was indeed too different too soon, and promised a return to their electronic roots for the band's third album.

Track listing
 "When Did This Storm Begin" (featuring Binary Finary) (Jeremy Dawson, Matthew Laws, Chad Petree) – 4:10
 "Money for That" (Dawson, Petree, Tim Kelly) – 3:23
 "I Owe You a Love Song" (Dawson, Petree, Stephen Petree) – 3:44
 "Ghost Town" (Dawson, Petree, Sisely Treasure) – 3:43
 "It Became a Lie on You" (Petree, S. Petree) – 4:28
 "Ricochet!" (Dawson, Petree, Treasure) – 2:39
 "Season of Love" (Petree, James Auringer) – 3:06
 "Poison" (Dawson) – 8:14
 "Blown Away" (Petree, John Schwandt) – 3:37
 "Turned to Real Life" (Dawson) – 3:44
 "Frozen Oceans" (Dawson, Petree) – 4:46

Bonus Tracks, Special Editions and B-sides
 "A Leading Edge" – 2:28 (iTunes Bonus Track)
 "Free Fall Melody" – 3:45 (Available on CD-Single through Dangerous Storm Studios)
 The album sold at Best Buy included an exclusive 16 minute DVD featuring interviews, studio footage and photo shoots.

Charts

Album

Singles

Personnel
 Sisely Treasure – vocals
 Chad Petree – vocals, guitar
 Jeremy Dawson – keyboards, bass
 Mikey Martin – drums, percussion

References

Shiny Toy Guns albums
2008 albums